Akkatangerahal is a village in Gokak taluk, Belagavi district of Karnataka state in Southern India. It is located in the Gokak Taluk of Belagavi district in Karnataka.

Etymology 
"Akkatangerahal" is a combination of three words. "Akka" stands for "Elder Sister" and "Tangi" stands for "Younger Sister", "Hal" stands for "Spoil".

See also
 Belagavi
 Districts of Karnataka

References

External links
 http://Belagavi.nic.in/

Villages in Belagavi district